Las Ánimas or Las Animas may refer to:

Chile
 Las Ánimas complex, Chile, an archaeological site
 Las Animas, Chile

Colombia
 Las Ánimas (volcano), a volcano in the Colombian Andes

Mexico
 Isla Las Ánimas, Mexico, an island in the Gulf of California

Spain
Las Ánimas, Spain, a village

United States
 Las Animas County, Colorado
 Las Animas, Colorado, a city
 Las Animas National Forest, in Colorado and New Mexico
 Rancho Las Animas, a land grant in Santa Clara County, California

Uruguay
 Cerro de las Ánimas, a peak and the second highest point in Uruguay
 Sierra de las Ánimas, a hill range

See also
 Animas (disambiguation)
 Anima (disambiguation)